Varkey is the  Saint Thomas Christian (Nasrani) variant of George. It is commonly given as the first name or found as a last name among the Christians of Kerala.

Notable people with this name

C. J. Varkey, Kuzhikulam (1921–2009), Indian Roman Catholic priest
Chunkath Joseph Varkey (1891–1953), Indian academic, journalist and politician
Muttathu Varkey (1913–1989), Indian writer and poet
Ponkunnam Varkey (1910–2004), Indian writer and activist
Sunny Varkey, Indian businessman
T. V. Varkey (born 1938), Indian writer, academic and activist
Varkey Vithayathil (1927–2011), Indian cardinal
Prof Kurula Varkey (Architect) (1945-2001)

See also
Varkeys, Indian supermarket chain